Ağrı District (also: Merkez, meaning "central") is a district of Ağrı Province of Turkey. Its seat is the city Ağrı. Its area is 1,695 km2, and its population is 150,335 (2021).

Composition
There is one municipality in Ağrı District:
 Ağrı

There are 107 villages in Ağrı District:

 Ağılbaşı
 Ahmetbey
 Akbulgur
 Akçay
 Altınçayır
 Anakaya
 Arakonak
 Aslangazi
 Aşağı Pamuktaş
 Aşağıağadeve
 Aşağıdürmeli
 Aşağıkent
 Aşağısaklıca
 Aşağıyoldüzü
 Aşkale
 Badıllı
 Balıksu
 Balkaynak
 Ballıbostan
 Baloluk
 Başçavuş
 Başkent
 Beşbulak
 Beşiktepe
 Bezirhane
 Boztoprak
 Bölükbaşı
 Cumaçay
 Çakıroba
 Çamurlu
 Çatalipaşa
 Çayırköy
 Çobanbeyi
 Çukuralan
 Çukurçayır
 Dedemaksut
 Doğutepe
 Dönerdere
 Dumanlı
 Eğribelen
 Eliaçık
 Esenköy
 Eskiharman
 Geçitalan
 Gümüşyazı
 Güneysu
 Güvendik
 Güvenli
 Hacısefer
 Hanoba
 Hıdır
 Kalender
 Karasu
 Kavacık
 Kavakköy
 Kayabey
 Kazlı
 Kocataş
 Koçbaşı
 Konuktepe
 Kovancık
 Kumlugeçit
 Mollaali
 Mollaosman
 Murat
 Murathan
 Oğlaklı
 Ortakent
 Ortayokuş
 Otlubayır
 Ozanlar
 Özbaşı
 Özveren
 Sabuncu
 Sağırtaş
 Sarıca
 Sarıdoğan
 Sarıharman
 Sarıtaş
 Soğan Eleşkirt
 Soğancumaçay
 Söğütlü
 Suçatağı
 Taştekne
 Taypınar
 Tellisırt
 Tezeren
 Uçarkaya
 Uzunveli
 Yakınca
 Yalnızkonak
 Yaylaköy
 Yazıcı
 Yazılı
 Yığıntepe
 Yolluyazı
 Yolugüzel
 Yoncalı
 Yorgunsöğüt
 Yukarıağadeve
 Yukarıdürmeli
 Yukarıküpkıran
 Yukarıpamuktaş
 Yukarısaklıca
 Yukarıyoldüzü
 Yurtpınar
 Ziyaret

References

Districts of Ağrı Province